Carlo Van Neste (1 April 1914 in Antwerp – 12 July 1992 in  Brussels) was a Belgian violinist.
He was part of the Trio Reine Elisabeth with the pianist Naum Sluzsny and with cellist Eric Felbusch.

References

External links 
 Carlo Van Neste asbl
 Prix Henri Vieuxtemps 
 Carlo Van Neste, Grand orchestre symphonique de l'INR, Daniel Sternefeld - Poème élégiaque for Violi (YouTube)

1914 births
1992 deaths
Musicians from Antwerp
École Normale de Musique de Paris alumni
Royal Conservatory of Brussels alumni
Academic staff of the Royal Conservatory of Brussels
Belgian classical violinists
20th-century classical violinists